Kazakhstan People's Unity Day, also known as Unity Day, is a Public holiday in Kazakhstan which celebrates the Kazakh people and the Kazakh nation alongside inter-ethnic relations between ethnic Kazakhs and all ethnicities living in Kazakhstan in peace and mutual respect embracing the diverse cultural and ethnic background of each Kazakhstani person. It is celebrated annually on May 1.

The holiday was first celebrated in 1996, due to the holiday being signed into law on October 18, 1995 by President Nursultan Nazarbayev, by which it also cancelled the Soviet era celebration of Labor Day.

Unity Day is a public holiday, so therefore most schools and businesses are closed for the day.

Typically, it is celebrated by children dressing up in their traditional  clothing and bringing foods of their ethnic background to school to introduce and share with their classmates as well as preparing performances in their mother tongue or traditional dances. 

Almost every city in the country holds a concert in the main square with traditional dances and songs of different ethnicities living side by side in Kazakhstan promoting unity, respect, and embracing the diversity of the people of Kazakhstan. It is a holiday that Kazakhstani people are proud of and it is an important day to celebrate and instill in children respect for people of all ethnic backgrounds from early age.

References

Annual events in Kazakhstan
May observances
Kazakhstan
Winter events in Kazakhstan
Society of Kazakhstan
Public holidays in Kazakhstan